KIMG-LD, virtual channel 31 (UHF digital channel 23), is a low-powered LATV-affiliated television station licensed to Ventura, California, United States. The station is owned by Ronald Ulloa, who also owns KVMD (also on channel 31) and KXLA (channel 44), and is the brother of KJLA (channel 57) owner Walter Ulloa. KIMG-LD is the Ventura County repeater of KVMD.

On May 30, 2007, KIMG-LP (then on channel 23) switched affiliations to LAT TV, as part of a new deal between LAT TV and Equity Media Holdings, who owned KIMG at the time. LAT TV was a Houston-based Spanish-language television network that launched in May 2006 and ceased operation two years later.

KIMG-LP switched affiliations from LAT TV to Retro Jams; it is unknown when the switch took place.

KIMG-LP signed off on March 9, 2009, in the wake of Equity's bankruptcy.  After failing to find a buyer at a bankruptcy auction, the station was sold to Ronald Ulloa on October 30, 2009.  The station had previously been included in Silver Point Finance's June 2 acquisition of other Equity stations, but that application was dismissed August 11, 2009.

On January 24, 2011, the station's license was cancelled by the FCC. However, as of November 2011, the station's license is still active, as KIMG-LD.

References

External links

Equity Media Holdings
IMG-LD
Television channels and stations established in 2003
Low-power television stations in the United States
IMG-LD